The 'Karl May Festival' (') is a theatre festival in Bad Segeberg, Schleswig-Holstein, Germany. Since 1952, Karl May's adventure novels about the Wild West have been put on stage as part of Karl May Festival in the Kalkberg Stadium at the scenic Segeberger Kalkberg.

The festival is not to be confused with Elspe Festival or Karl May Festtage in Radebeul.

External links 
 Website der Karl-May-Spiele Bad Segeberg
 Karl May & Co. · The Karl May Magazine (with reports about the Karl May Festival for more than 26 years)
 Karl-May-Treff: A website with information about the Karl May Festival in Bad Segeberg, a forum with a variety of topics, as well as a magazine
 Extensive information about the festival at Kalkberg, complete with a history and numerous pictures, interviews, and reports 

Theatre festivals in Germany
Tourist attractions in Schleswig-Holstein
Karl May